Ellochotis is a genus of moths belonging to the family Tineidae.

Species
Ellochotis caligata (Meyrick, 1913)
Ellochotis ectocharis Gozmány, 1976
Ellochotis exilis Gozmány & Vári, 1973
Ellochotis fraudulenta (Meyrick, 1912)
Ellochotis infausta Meyrick, 1920
Ellochotis leontopa (Meyrick, 1908)
Ellochotis lyncodes (Meyrick, 1921)
Ellochotis opifica (Meyrick, 1908)
Ellochotis picroxesta (Meyrick, 1926)
Ellochotis purpurea (Stainton, 1860)
Ellochotis territa (Meyrick, 1920)
Ellochotis trophias (Meyrick, 1908)
Ellochotis verecunda (Meyrick, 1912)

References

Myrmecozelinae